Sant Iscle de Vallalta is a municipality in the comarca of the Maresme in Catalonia, Spain. It is situated inland from the coast, in the valley of the Sant Pol river below the Montnegre range. A local road links the town with Arenys de Munt, Sant Cebria De Vallata and Sant Pol de Mar.

References

 Panareda Clopés, Josep Maria; Rios Calvet, Jaume; Rabella Vives, Josep Maria (1989). Guia de Catalunya, Barcelona: Caixa de Catalunya.  (Spanish).  (Catalan).

External links 
Official website 
 Government data pages 

Municipalities in Maresme